Collaboration is a smooth jazz studio album by George Benson and Earl Klugh released in 1987. The album was certified gold in the United States in February 1988.

Track listing

Personnel 
 George Benson – electric guitar
 Earl Klugh – classical guitar
 Paul Jackson Jr. – rhythm guitar
 Greg Phillinganes – keyboards, synthesizers, synthesizer arrangements (2, 3, 5, 6, 7)
 Rhett Lawrence – keyboard programming
 Jason Miles – synthesizer programming (1, 4)
 Larry Williams – synthesizer programming (2, 3, 5, 6, 7), horn arrangements (2)
 James Newton Howard – synthesizers (5, 7, 8), synthesizer programming (5), synthesizer string arrangements (5, 7, 8)
 Marcus Miller – bass guitar (1-7), rhythm track arrangements (1, 6), synthesizer arrangements (1)
 Chuck Domanico – upright bass (8)
 Harvey Mason – drums (1-7)
 Jimmy Bralower – LinnDrum programming (7)
 Vinnie Colaiuta – drums (8)
 Paulinho da Costa – percussion
 Marty Paich – string arrangements (1)
 Randy Goodrum – rhythm track and synthesizer arrangements (7)

Production 
 Producer – Tommy LiPuma
 Production Coordinator – Rosemary Diminno
 Recorded and Mixed by Bill Schnee
 Additional Recording – Carl Beatty, Eric Calvi, Randy Goodrum, Dave Palmer, Ross Pallone, Al Schmitt and Steven Strassman.
 Assistant Engineers – Mark Cretella, Mike Crowiak, Peter Doell, Dan Garcia, Mike Iacopelli, Michael Mason, Dave O'Donnell, Ray Pyle, Joe Schiff, Stephen Shelton and Bart Stevens. 
 Mix Assistants – Dan Garcia and Bart Stevens 
 Mastered by Doug Sax at The Mastering Lab (Hollywood, California).
 Art Direction and Design – Laura LiPuma
 Photography – Stuart Watson
 Management – Ken Fritz, Dennis Turner and Bruce Hervey.

Charts

References 

1987 albums
Earl Klugh albums
George Benson albums
Albums produced by Tommy LiPuma
Warner Records albums
Albums recorded at Capitol Studios
Albums recorded at Sunset Sound Recorders
Albums recorded at United Western Recorders